Aarjes (also Arjis, 'Arjess) is a village located in the Zgharta District in the North Governorate of Lebanon. Its population is Maronite Catholic.

References

External links
 Ehden Family Tree

Populated places in the North Governorate
Zgharta District
Maronite Christian communities in Lebanon